Renfrew/Hurds Lake Water Aerodrome  is located  south of Renfrew, Ontario, Canada.

See also
 Renfrew/Black Donald Lake Water Aerodrome

References

Registered aerodromes in Ontario
Transport in Renfrew County
Seaplane bases in Ontario